Nayagarh State was one of the princely states of India from the period of the British Raj. It was located in present-day Nayagarh district, Odisha.

The state was bounded in the north by Khandpara State and Puri District. The capital was at Nayagarh. The southern part of the state was forested and mountainous and was inhabited mainly by Khonds.

History
According to traditions, Nayagarh state was alleged to have been founded by a scion from the Rewa State before 15th century, but lack of written archival historical records marks them as untenable due to the non-alignment of timelines of both Nayagarh and its collateral Khandpara state with that of the corresponding Rewa state which was founded in 1618 succeeding from Bandhavgarh kingdom, which possibly points to its legendary origins due to the historical obscurity. None of the chiefs of Nayagarh appear to have received farmans from both Mughals and Marathas until when the Bhonsle Maharaja of Nagpur Raghoji I Bhonsle gifted the chiefs for his assistance during the Maratha conquest of Orissa. Although it is likely that a local chieftain by the name Baghel Singh (1480-1510 CE) who is reputed to be the founder of Nayagarh, as it was known as Baghua Nayagarh, may likely be the founder of the state and also the progenitor of the dynasty with the same name.

Under Raghunath Singh's (1565-1595) successors Khandpara State which was initially part of Nayagarh State became a separate kingdom in 1599 with his younger son Jadunath Singh inheriting Khandpara while his elder son Harihar Singh continuing at Nayagarh.

The last ruler signed the instrument of accession to the Indian Union on 1 January 1948, merging his state into Odisha forming a part of the Nayagarh district.

Rulers
The rulers of Nayagarh State bore the title of Raja. The emblem of the Nayagarh royal family was the head of a tiger, the same state symbol as that of the rulers in neighbouring Khandpara State.

Baghel Singh (1480–1510 CE)
N/A
Raghunath Singh (1565–1595)
Harihar Singh
N/A
Chandrasekhar Singh Mandhata
Purushottam Singh Mandhata
Mrutyunjay Singh Mandhata (...–1784)
Binayak Singh Mandhata (1784–1825)
Braja Bandhu Singh Mandhata (1825 – 30 September 1851)
Ladhu Kishore Singh Mandhata (30 September 1851 – 1889)
Balbhadra Singh (1889–1890)
Raghunath Singh Mandhata (2 Mar 1890–4 Sep 1897)
Narayan Singh Mandhata (1897 – 7 Dec 1918)
Krushna Chandra Singh Mandhata (7 Dec 1918 – 1 January 1948)

Titular
Krushna Chandra Singh Mandhata 

Brajendra Kishore Singh Mandata 

Gajendra Chandra Singh Mandata (present)

See also
 Eastern States Agency
 Political integration of India

References

Princely states of Odisha
History of Odisha
Nayagarh district